The Black Hand (The Birth of the Mafia) is a 1973 Italian crime film written and directed  by Antonio Racioppi and starring Lionel Stander, Rosanna Fratello and Michele Placido.

Plot
Italian-American cop Joe Petrosino infiltrates the Mafia in turn of the 20th century New York.

Cast

Production
Luigi Cozzi, one of the nine credited screenwriters on the film that producer Carlo Infascelli wanted to change the script depending on the actors demands. For example, Cozzi claims that Infascelli had to change the film per Phillipe Leroy's request. Cozzi noted that he was phoned by Infascelli and was told to change the scenes per Leroy's demands within 24 hours. Cozzi noted he was often phoned and told to find reasons and ways things changed.

Release
The Black Hand was released in Italy on March 16, 1973 where it was distributed theatrically by Roma Film. The film grossed 230.363 million Italian lira on its theatrical run.

Reception
John Raisback of the Monthly Film Bulletin reviewed an 85-minute dubbed version of the film, finding it having a "rambling plot line" and that large portions of the dubbed dialogue were lifted straight from The Godfather.

Remake
In 2017, Paramount announced that it has acquired the movie rights for an English language adaptation. The new film, due for release in 2018, will star Leonardo DiCaprio as Joe, and will be partly based on Stephan Talty's upcoming novelization of Petrosino's assassination.

References

Footnotes

Sources

External links

Italian crime films
1973 crime films
1973 films
Films scored by Carlo Rustichelli
1970s Italian-language films
1970s Italian films